Dağdibi is a village in the Uludere district of Şırnak Province in Turkey. The village is populated by Kurds of the Goyan and Sindî tribes and had a population of 632 in 2021.

The hamlet of Konacık is attached to Dağdibi.

References 

Villages in Uludere District
Kurdish settlements in Şırnak Province